Asghan: The Dragon Slayer is a fantasy-themed hack-and-slash action role-playing video game developed by Silmarils and released in December 1998. Players take on the persona of Asghan, a warrior prince who swears to avenge the death of his father by dragons. The game is praised for smooth integration of action and role-playing elements as well as a wide array of enemies and weapons. It suffers, however, from lacking character development and awkward controls.

Story
When the prosperous land of Brightmoon faces a pernicious threat in the form of dragons invading from the neighboring Isle of Kyrk, the warrior prince Asghan begins a perilous journey to counter the attack. The dragons themselves are spurred along by the evil sorcerer Morghan. Asghan embarks on his journey both to avenge his father as well as protect his land.

Gameplay
Asghan: The Dragon Slayer is characterized largely by Tomb Raider-esque physical puzzles (running, jumping, crawling) as well as typical fantasy elements such as spellcasting and exorcism. Apart from being agile and magically proficient, Asghan is also able to use a wealth of different weapons. He employs these skills in a series of dungeons and arenas including but not limited to a ferocious female dragon's dungeon, a green dragon's dungeon, an iceberg, a forest, and a witch's cavern.

Influences
Like most modern fantasy franchises, Asghan: The Dragon Slayer is littered with elements from J. R. R. Tolkien's The Lord of the Rings story. Throughout the game, players encounter Hobbits, Orcs, Elves and great Eagles resembling those found in Tolkien's works.

Reception

PC Gaming Worlds Mat Peck gave Asghan a score of 8/10. He called it "a great game".

References

External links
 Asghan: The Dragon Slayer online walkthrough

Role-playing video games
Action role-playing video games
Fantasy video games
Video games developed in France
Windows games
Windows-only games
1998 video games
Ubisoft games
Silmarils (company) games
Single-player video games
Video games about dragons
Grolier Interactive games